Kevin Hansen may refer to:

Kevin Hansen (footballer) (born 1979), German footballer
Kevin Hansen (volleyball) (born 1982), American volleyball player
Kevin Hansen (racing driver) (born 1998), Swedish rallycross driver
Kevin Hansen (rugby league) (1927–1971), Australian rugby league footballer